Moose Mountain is an -long ridge located in the eastern part of the town of Hanover in Grafton County, New Hampshire. It is traversed by the Appalachian Trail, a  National Scenic Trail from Georgia to Maine. Moose Mountain is outside the White Mountain National Forest, but the trail runs through a narrow corridor along the ridge which is administered by the U.S. Forest Service. The trail can be accessed from the south along Three Mile Road in Hanover, and from the north along Goose Pond Road in Lyme, New Hampshire.

Moose Mountain has two summits, slightly over 1 mile apart. The mountain lies entirely within the Connecticut River watershed, with runoff flowing ultimately to Long Island Sound. The north end of the mountain drains into Hewes Brook, which enters the Connecticut River in Lyme, and most of the western side of the ridge drains into Mink Brook, a tributary of the Connecticut that flows through Hanover. The east side and extreme southwestern side of Moose Mountain drain into tributaries of the Mascoma River, which flows to the Connecticut through Lebanon, New Hampshire. Goose Pond is a large lake that sits to the east of Moose Mountain.

Northeast Airlines Flight 946 crashed into the side of Moose Mountain in 1968, resulting in the deaths of 32 passengers and crew.

Notes

References

External links
 

Ridges of New Hampshire
Landforms of Grafton County, New Hampshire
Mountains on the Appalachian Trail